The Edmonton Blues Festival (formerly Edmonton's Labatt Blues Festival) is an annual blues music festival in Edmonton, Alberta, Canada, which was first held in 1999. The festival runs for three days (a Friday, Saturday, and Sunday) in mid-August at the Heritage Amphitheatre in Hawrelak Park. In 2008, the festival was the recipient of the 'Keeping The Blues Alive Award' from the Blues Foundation, based in Memphis, Tennessee. Due to renovations that will close Hawrelak Park until 2026, the festival is moving  to Edmonton's RE/MAX Field.

List of performers

2000

Friday 25 August
Rockin' Highliners
Rosie Ledet "The Zydeco Sweetheart"
Lone Star Shootout ft. Lonnie Brooks, Phillip Walker & Long John Hunter

Saturday 26 August
Hot Cottage with "The Craft Horns"
Bryan Lee "The Braille Blues Daddy"
Debbie Davies
James Harman
The Fabulous Thunderbirds

Sunday 27 August
Big Dave MacLean and the Tim Williams Electric Band
Maurice John Vaughn
Walter "Wolfman" Washington & The Roadmasters
Shemekia Copeland
Anson Fungerburgh & The Rockets ft. Sam Myers

2001

Friday 24 August
Rosie Ledet the Zydeco Sweetheart
Paul deLay Band
Luther "Guitar Junior" Johnson

Saturday 25 August
Bad News Blues Band
Paul Osher "Alone with the Blues"
Janiva Magness
Rod Piazza and the Mighty Flyers
The Rolling Fork Blues Review ft. Nappy Brown, Pinetop Perkins, Hubert Sumlin, Rusty Zinn

Sunday 26 August
Brent Parkin Band with Rusty Reed
Paul Rishell & Annie Raines
Norton Buffalo and the Knockouts
Sleepy LaBeef
Dr. John

2002

Friday 23 August
Jack Semple Band
Roy Rogers & the Delta Rhythm Kings
Charlie Musselwhite

Saturday 24 August
Cephas & Wiggins
Terry Hanck
Big Jack Johnson & the Oilers
C. J. Chenier & the Red Hot Louisiana Band
Marcia Ball

Sunday 25 August
Rory Block 
The Twisters
Kelley Hunt
Sonny Rhodes
Ike Turner & the Kings of Rhythm

2003

Friday 22 August
Sue Foley
Junior Watson
Mark Hummel's Blues Harp Blowout ft. James Harman and Snooky Pryor

Saturday 23 August
Tom Rigney and Flambeau
Big Time Sarah
Dave Hole
Magic Slim and the Teardrops
Duke Robillard Band with a special appearance by Ruth Brown

Sunday 24 August
Ann Rabson
Paul Reddick and the Sidemen
Ponty Bone and the Squeezetones
Omar and the Howlers
The John Hammond Band

2004

Friday 20 August
 Morgan Davis
 Chubby Carrier & The Bayou Swamp Band
 James Cotton

Saturday 21 August
 Donald Ray Johnson
 Lil' Ed Williams and the Blues Imperials
 Sugar Ray Norcia and the Bluetones
 Angela Strehli
 Roomful of Blues

Sunday 22 August
 Steve James
 Gary Primich
 Kenny "Blues Boss" Wayne
 Sista Monica Parker
 Jimmie Vaughan

2005

Friday 19 August
 Curley Bridges
 W. C. Clark
 Koko Taylor and her Blues Machine

Saturday 20 August
 Mike Kindred
 David Gogo
 Mem Shannon and the Membership
 Downchild Blues Band
 The Mannish Boys featuring Finis Tasby, Kid Ramos, and Johnny Dyer

Sunday 21 August
 Mary Flower
 Craig Horton
 Zac Harmon and the Mid-South Blues Revue
 Bob Margolin with Willie "Big Eyes" Smith and Rev. Billy C. Wirtz
 Delbert McClinton

2006

Friday 25 August 
 Kenny Neal and Billy Branch
 Phillip Walker with the Texas Horns
 Mark Hummel with Billy Boy Arnold and Lee Oskar

Saturday 26 August 
 Eden Brent 
 James Hinkle with the Texas Horns
 Jimmy Thackery 
 Reba Russell
 Terrence Simien 
 The Hollywood Blue Flames

Sunday 27 August 
 Fruteland Jackson
 Pete Turland Band with Paul Pugat
 Diunna Greenleaf and Blue Mercy with the Texas Horns
 Henry Gray and the Cats featuring Paul "Lil' Buck" Sinegal
 The Chicago Blues Reunion with Paul Butterfield, Michael Bloomfield, Nick Gravenites, Tracy Nelson, Harvey Mandel, Barry Goldberg, Corky Siegel, and Sam Lay.

See also

List of Canadian blues festivals and venues 
List of festivals in Edmonton
List of festivals in Alberta
List of music festivals in Canada

References

External links
Edmonton's Labatt Blues Festival Official website

Music festivals established in 1999
Music festivals in Edmonton
Blues festivals in Canada
Folk festivals in Canada